LFM may refer to:

 Liber feudorum maior, a medieval Catalan cartulary
 L.F.M. Memorial Academy (Lawrence Franklin Mather), Miramichi, New Brunswick, Canada
 Linear feet per minute in gas flow measurement
 La Familia Michoacana, former Mexican drug cartel
 Linear frequency modulation, a radar waveform also known as a Chirp
 Language Freedom Movement, a 1960s political organisation concerned with the status of the Irish language

French schools
 Lycée Franco-Mexicain, Mexico City
 Lycée Français de Madrid, Spain
 Lycée Français de Mascate, Muscat, Oman
 Lycée Français de Medellin, Colombia
 Lycée Français Montaigne or Lycée Montaigne de N'Djamena, Chad
 Lycée français de Moscou